Barrie Edward Fairbrother (born 30 December 1950 in Hackney, London, England), is an English footballer who played as a forward for Orient and Millwall in the Football League before moving to Australia where he played for Mooroolbark and Brisbane Lions.

References

External links

1950 births
Living people
English footballers
Footballers from the London Borough of Hackney
Association football forwards
Leyton Orient F.C. players
Millwall F.C. players
English Football League players
National Soccer League (Australia) players
Expatriate soccer players in Australia
Mooroolbark SC players